Vietnam: Black Ops is a 2000 video game developed by Fused Software and published by ValuSoft.

Reception

IGN rated the game a 5.2 out of 10 stating "Budget price or no, those brave or foolish enough to purchase this one deserve a purple heart for their struggle"

The game received a sequel, Vietnam 2: Special Assignment, of which GameSpot stated: "it's hard to imagine standards low enough to warrant playing it."

Sales
The game sold more than 132,000 units in the United States. According to Single Cell Software(developers of Vietnam 2: Special Assignment), Vietnam: Black Ops ultimately sold 170,000 copies.

References

2000 video games
First-person shooters
Video games developed in the United States
Video games set in 1969
Vietnam War video games
Windows games
Windows-only games